Juan Muñiz can refer to:
 
 Juan Muñiz  (footballer, born 1992),  Spanish footballer
 Juan Ramón López Muñiz, Spanish football manager